This is a list of Bien de Interés Cultural landmarks in the Province of Toledo, Spain.

 Consuegra Dam
 Convent of la Concepción Francisca 
 Convento de Santa Fé                        
 Museum of Santa Cruz
 Toledo railway station

References 

 
Toledo